Global-scale Observations of the Limb and Disk (GOLD) is a heliophysics Mission of Opportunity (MOU) for NASA's Explorers program. Led by Richard Eastes at the Laboratory for Atmospheric and Space Physics, which is located at the University of Colorado Boulder, GOLD mission is to image the boundary between Earth and space in order to answer questions about the effects of solar and atmospheric variability of Earth's space weather. GOLD was one of 11 proposals selected, of the 42 submitted, for further study in September 2011. On 12 April 2013, NASA announced that GOLD, along with the Ionospheric Connection Explorer (ICON), had been selected for flight in 2017. GOLD, along with its commercial host satellite SES-14, launched on 25 January 2018.

Mission concept and history 
GOLD is intended to perform a two-year mission imaging Earth's thermosphere and ionosphere from geostationary orbit. GOLD is a two-channel far-ultraviolet (FUV) imaging spectrograph built by the Laboratory for Atmospheric and Space Physics at the University of Colorado Boulder and flown as a hosted payload on the commercial communications satellite SES-14. Additional organizations participating in the GOLD mission include the National Center for Atmospheric Research, Virginia Tech, the University of California, Berkeley, the University of Central Florida, Computational Physics Inc., the National Oceanic and Atmospheric Administration (NOAA), the U.S. Naval Research Laboratory (NRL), Boston University, and Clemson University.

In June 2017, SES announced the successful integration of GOLD with the SES-14 satellite under construction at Airbus Defence and Space in Toulouse, France. GOLD was launched on 25 January 2018 at 22:20 UTC aboard Ariane 5 ECA VA241 from the Centre spatial Guyanais.

Scientific objectives 
The scientific objectives of the GOLD mission are to determine how geomagnetic storms alter the temperature and composition of Earth's atmosphere, to analyze the global-scale response of the thermosphere to solar extreme-ultraviolet variability, to investigate the significance of atmospheric waves and tides propagating from below the temperature structure of the thermosphere and to resolve how the structure of the equatorial ionosphere influences the formation and evolution of equatorial plasma density irregularities. The viewpoint provided by GOLD geostationary orbit from which the same hemisphere is always observable is a new perspective on the Earth's upper atmosphere. This viewpoint allows local time, universal time and longitudinal variations of the thermosphere and ionosphere's response to the various forcing mechanisms to be uniquely determined.

Results 
Data from GOLD has been used to confirm that variation in the equatorial ionization anomaly at night and in the early morning is governed by atmospheric waves in the lower atmosphere. GOLD observations have also implicated gravity waves emanating from the lower atmosphere in the seeding of equatorial plasma bubbles, which degrade GPS performance.
GOLD daytime observations on thermosphere column density ratio of atomix oxygen and Nitregon bring a lot of new findings. First, GOLD observation shows that even weak, or minor geomagnetic activity (maximum Kp=1.7) can still generate significant disturbance in the thermosphere and ionosphere. This is crucial for the space weather forecast because the pre-quiet condition before the disturbed time determines the accuracy of forecast. Furthermore, the  neutral tongue, which is an enhancement of O/N2 surrounded by depletion of O/N2, and had only been discovered in model simulations, is observed firstly by GOLD.This modify the classic theory of thermospheric composition disturbance during storm time. The theory only predict that the disturbance corotate from day to night, but did not mention what else occur to the depletion.

References

External links 
 GOLD website by the University of Central Florida
 GOLD website by NASA

Spacecraft instruments
Explorers Program
Spacecraft launched in 2018
Piggyback mission
Spectrometers
Geospace monitoring satellites